Downingia is a genus of 13 annual plants native to western North America and Chile. Commonly known as calico flowers, they are notable for forming mass displays of small but colorful blooms around vernal pools. A number are uncommon endemics in California.

The stems may be decumbent or erect, 10–40 cm in length, with narrow cauline leaves that may drop off before the flower develops. The flowers are typically inverted by the twisting of the ovary during blooming. Colors range from blue and pink to white, with the lower (larger) lip including a white or yellow patch. The lower lip generally consists of three lobes, while the upper lip is much smaller and has two lobes.

The genus is named after American horticulturalist A. J. Downing (1815-1852).

Species

External links

Jepson Manual Treatment
USDA Plants Profile

 
Campanulaceae genera